Classical Chinese lexicon is the lexicon of Classical Chinese, a language register marked by a vocabulary that greatly differs from the lexicon of modern vernacular Chinese, or Baihua.

In terms of conciseness and compactness, Classical Chinese rarely uses words composed of two Chinese characters; nearly all words are of one syllable only. This stands directly in contrast with modern Chinese dialects, in which two-syllable words are extremely common. This phenomenon exists, in part, because polysyllabic words evolved in Chinese to disambiguate homophones that result from sound changes. This is similar to such phenomena in English as the pen–pin merger of many dialects in the American south: because the words "pin" and "pen" sound alike in such dialects of English, a certain degree of confusion can occur unless one adds qualifiers like "ink pen" and "stick pin." Similarly, Chinese has acquired many polysyllabic words in order to disambiguate monosyllabic words that sounded different in earlier forms of Chinese but identical in one region or another during later periods. Because Classical Chinese is based on the literary examples of ancient Chinese literature, it has almost none of the two-syllable words present in modern varieties of Chinese.

Classical Chinese has more pronouns compared to the modern vernacular. In particular, whereas Mandarin has one general character to refer to the first-person pronoun ("I"/"me"), Literary Chinese has several, many of which are used as part of honorific language (see Chinese honorifics), and several of which have different grammatical uses (first-person collective, first-person possessive, etc.).

In syntax, Classical Chinese words are not restrictively categorized into parts of speech: nouns used as verbs, adjectives used as nouns, and so on. There is no copula in Classical Chinese; "是" is a copula in modern Chinese but in old Chinese it was originally a near demonstrative ("this"), the modern Chinese equivalent of which is "這".

Beyond grammar and vocabulary differences, Classical Chinese can be distinguished by literary and cultural differences: an effort to maintain parallelism and rhythm, even in prose works, and extensive use of literary and cultural allusions, thereby also contributing to brevity.

Many final particles and interrogative particles are found in Literary Chinese.

Function words 

Note that for the descriptions provided above, English equivalents are provided in double quotation marks (""), while equivalents in vernacular Chinese are provided in hooked brackets (「」).

Content words 
As with function words, there are many differences between the content words of Classical Chinese and those of Baihua. Below are synonyms used in the two registers. Some Classical Chinese words can have more than one meaning.

However, Classical Chinese words still exist among many chengyu, or Chinese idioms.

The Classical Chinese words and examples will be written in traditional Chinese characters, and the modern vernacular will be written in both simplified and traditional characters.

See also

Chinese adjectives
Chinese grammar
Chinese particles
Chinese pronouns
Chinese verbs
Classical Chinese grammar
Classical Chinese
Vernacular Chinese

Sources

《新高中文言手册》 （1998年 北京华书）
《新华字典》 （第10版）

Further reading 
 

 
 
 

 (Original from Harvard University) (Digitized 2008-10-13)
  (Original from Oxford University) (Digitized 2007-07-03)
  (Original from the University of California) (Digitized 2007-05-02)
  (Original from Harvard University)

External links

Chinese Notes: 古文入门 Introduction to Classical Chinese

Chinese grammar
Classical Chinese